Vinhais is a municipality in the district of Bragança, northern Portugal. The population in 2011 was 9,066, in an area of 694.76 km2.

The present mayor is Américo Afonso Pereira, elected by the Socialist Party. The municipal holiday is May 20.

Parishes

The municipality is composed of 26 parishes:

 Agrochão
 Candedo
 Celas
 Curopos e Vale de Janeiro
 Edral
 Edrosa
 Ervedoa
 Moimenta e Montouto
 Nunes e Ousilhão
 Paçó
 Penhas Juntas
 Quirás e Pinheiro Novo
 Rebordelo
 Santalha
 Sobreiró de Baixo e Alvaredos
 Soeira, Fresulfe e Mofreita
 Travanca e Santa Cruz
 Tuizelo
 Vale das Fontes
 Vila Boa de Ousilhão
 Vila Verde
 Vilar de Lomba e São Jomil
 Vilar de Ossos
 Vilar de Peregrinos
 Vilar Seco de Lomba
 Vinhais

Geography

The northern boundary of the municipality extends to the border with Spain, 23 km away.

It is perched on the slopes of the Coroa mountains at an altitude of approximately 600 meters, protected from the cold winds of the north by the Ciradelha mountain, where in remote times there was a Luso-Roman castro. On the south side is the Tuela River valley. There are three other rivers in the concelho: the Rabaçal, the Mente, and the Baceiro. They are relatively unpolluted and provide fish for locals and tourists. The Baceiro has a trout hatchery which is deactivated but will be reopened soon.

The Castle of Vinhais is a protected public interest.

History

This ancient town, older than the founding of Portugal, owes its name to the abundance of vineyards that covered the slopes and produced excellent wine. Today the production of wine has almost disappeared.

In the time of the Romans there was a settlement called Veniatia, through which passed the road that linked Braga to Astorga. Suebi, Visigoths, Vandals, and Moors all were present in the region.  One of the first kings of Portugal, Sancho II had a castle and walls built, around which grew a small town soon to be called Vinhaes. This town was nicknamed Rich Town, because of the abundance of its wine, linen, silk, and wool.

Several times occupied by the Castilians it became part of Portugal again in 1403. In 1659 a Spanish general invaded the region and besieged Vinhais with 1,700 men. The castle resisted and the enemy retreated across the border, burning all the houses outside the walls as well as all the villages they passed through.

After the fall of the monarchy in 1910, the Royalist rebel Paiva Couceiro entered Vinhais and attacked the Republican forces, defeating them and sending them in retreat to Chaves

Paiva Couceiro's entry into Vinhais was received with joy because this town was still pro-monarchy.  Soon, the Provisional Government of the Republic sent 400 soldiers to attack the rebels. After some violent skirmishes the rebels were defeated and forced to surrender. See Royalist attack on Chaves

Today, Vinhais is a small, rather isolated municipality, with an aging rural population. Without industry and with a diminishing population, it relies on tourism, an annual fair specializing in smoked meats, and some agriculture, especially chestnut growing.

The northern part of Vinhais is also part of the Montesinho Natural Park, with a significant interest on the rural and agricultural kind of life and wild life preservation. Among the protected species are the Iberian Wolf, Roe Deer, Wild Boar, Iberian Lynx, Common Genet, Red Fox and European Otter. To accomplish a better understanding of the wild life, there is now a Biological Park (Parque Biológico de Vinhais) in the Ciradelha Mountain.

References

External links
Municipality official government
Vinhais

Towns in Portugal
Municipalities of Bragança District